Vasad is a town in the Anand District of Gujarat, India. It is located on the bank of the Mahi. It was formerly known as Vasudhanagari, and is situated on the north bank of the Mahi and serves as a gateway to the Charotar.

Geography

Vasad is located between Ahmedabad and Vadodara. Forests surround Vasad to the south and northeast. The central government has established the Soil Conservation and Water Research Institute in Vasad to reduce soil erosion and improve water management in this part of Gujarat.

Economy

There are 45 toor dal (pigeon pea) processing mills located in Vasad.
There is fertilizer factor Maa shakti enterprise

Transport 

Vasad is connected by road to National Highway 64. Vasad Junction is the town's railway station.

References 

Tejwani, KG. (1979) Soil fertility status, maintenance, and conservation for agroforestry systems on wasted lands in India. Soils Research in Agroforestry. 171-174 Retrieved from https://agris.fao.org/agris-search/search.do?recordID=US201302654336

External links 

Cities and towns in Anand district